Nowe Marzy  is a village in the administrative district of Gmina Dragacz, within Świecie County, Kuyavian-Pomeranian Voivodeship, in north-central Poland. It is near the A1 motorway from Gdańsk to Gorzyczki, which between 2008 and 2011 ended there but has since been extended.

The village has a population of 160.

References

Nowe Marzy